Faunalytics is a nonprofit organization that provides animal advocates with access to the research and analysis of various animal issues. Its research areas include factory farming, veganism and vegetarianism, companion animals, animal testing, hunting, animal trapping, wild animal suffering, and the use of animals for entertainment purposes (zoos, circuses, racing, fights, etc.). Faunalytics was founded in 2000 by Che Green, and operated under the name Humane Research Council until 2015. In a book about animal activists in the US and France, Elizabeth Cherry cites the use of Faunalytics studies as part of activists' move towards practical research.

History 

Faunalytics is a non-profit organization based in Olympia, Washington, funded through grants and donations. Founded by Che Green, a former analyst and research manager, Faunalytics utilizes contributions of time and expertise from committed professionals in research, marketing, and communications, as well as business service providers and designers for print and online media.

Faunalytics has the GuideStar Platinum Seal of Transparency, and is currently listed as one of Animal Charity Evaluators' Top Charities.

Research 

Faunalytics has conducted or contributed to a number of research studies such as a study of public perception of the animal protection movement (National Council for Animal Protection, 2006), the Humane Index (The Humane Society of the United States, 2007), and an independent study on advocating meat reduction and vegetarianism to U.S. adults (2007). 

 

Faunalytics also maintains a research library with over 5,000 summaries of external research studies on animal related issues. They also produce a series called "Faunalytics Fundamentals", a collection of animal protection topic overviews illustrated using infographics and graphs, and other interactive visual resources for animal advocates.

Animal Charity Evaluators review 
Animal Charity Evaluators (ACE) named Faunalytics as one of its Standout Charities in its 2015, 2017, 2019, and 2020 annual charity recommendations. ACE designates as Standout Charities those organizations which they do not feel are as strong as their Top Charities, but which excel in at least one way and are exceptionally strong compared to animal charities in general. ACE reviews organizations designated as a Standout Charity every other year.

In its December 2019 review of Faunalytics, ACE cites Faunalytics' strengths as its focus on an important field (creating and promoting research) and its publication of important research on topics related to effective animal advocacy. Their review states that Faunalytics' research projects are highly transparent, publicly available, and seem to be the result of an impact-focused project prioritization process. According to ACE, their weakness is that the effects of their programs on animals are indirect and difficult to measure.

ACE named Faunalytics as one of three of its Top Charities in 2021. The ACE review highlights the value of research as an important contribution to farmed animal protection, and Faunalytics' impact and effectiveness.

See also 
The Humane League
Mercy for Animals
List of animal rights groups

References

External links 
 

2000 establishments in Washington (state)
Animal welfare organizations based in the United States
Non-profit organizations based in Olympia, Washington
Organizations established in 2000
Organizations associated with effective altruism
501(c)(3) organizations